Shelter Island Heights is a hamlet and census-designated place (CDP) located in the Town of Shelter Island, Suffolk County, New York, United States. It is located on the north side of the island of Shelter Island, surrounding the village of Dering Harbor. The population was 1,048 at the 2010 census.

Geography
Shelter Island Heights is located at 41° 4' 41" North, 72° 21' 3" West (41.078150, -72.350936).

Demographics

Demographics of the CDP
At the 2000 census there were 981 people, 459 households and 302 families residing in the CDP. The population density was 183.1 per square mile (70.7/km2). There were 1,374 housing units at an average density of 256.5/sq mi (99.0/km2). The racial makeup of the CDP was 98.17% White, 0.31% African American, 0.41% Asian, and 1.12% from two or more races. Hispanic or Latino of any race were 1.33% of the population.

There were 459 households, of which 16.3% had children under the age of 18 living with them, 58.8% were married couples living together, 5.9% had a female householder with no husband present, and 34.0% were non-families. 29.8% of all households were made up of individuals, and 20.7% had someone living alone who was 65 years of age or older. The average household size was 2.14 and the average family size was 2.62.

14.9% of the population were under the age of 18, 3.1% from 18 to 24, 14.3% from 25 to 44, 31.9% from 45 to 64, and 35.9% who were 65 years of age or older. The median age was 56 years. For every 100 females, there were 87.6 males. For every 100 females age 18 and over, there were 86.8 males.

The median household income was $65,446 and the median family income was $76,162. Males had a median income of $46,750 compared with $37,955 for females. The per capita income was $34,083. About 4.6% of families and 6.2% of the population were below the poverty line, including 7.6% of those under age 18 and 2.9% of those age 65 or over.

See also
Shelter Island Heights Historic District

References

Shelter Island (town), New York
Census-designated places in New York (state)
Hamlets in New York (state)
Census-designated places in Suffolk County, New York
Hamlets in Suffolk County, New York
Populated coastal places in New York (state)